Mirko Mikić (born 23 August 1985) is a Bosnian handball player for RK Borac Banja Luka and the Bosnian national team. He started playing handball for local club RK Kotor Varoš in Kotor Varoš.

References

1985 births
Living people
Bosnia and Herzegovina male handball players
Sportspeople from Banja Luka
RK Borac Banja Luka players
Mediterranean Games competitors for Bosnia and Herzegovina
Competitors at the 2009 Mediterranean Games
Serbs of Bosnia and Herzegovina